Rajendra Rathore (December 12, 1961 – February 16, 2018) was an organic chemist and professor at Marquette University in Milwaukee, Wisconsin as  Pfletschinger-Habermann professor of organic chemistry. He made important contributions in the area of supramolecular chemistry, synthesis of novel electro-active molecules, and drug discovery. Rathore died on February 16, 2018, after complications from chronic pulmonary sarcoidosis.

Education 
Rathore received his M.Sc. from the Indian Institute of Technology Kanpur in 1986, under the mentorship of S. Chandrasekaran. He earned his Ph.D. in organic chemistry from the University of Western Ontario in London, Canada in 1990. He was a post-doctoral research associate and then a visiting assistant professor during 1992–2000 at the University of Houston under the supervision of Jay Kochi. Rajendra Rathore joined the faculty at Marquette University in 2000.

Research 
Rathore was the Pfletschinger-Habermann Professor of Organic Chemistry at Marquette University. He was also nominated for the Helen Way Klingler College of Arts and Sciences Scholar of the Year for 2017–2018, in recognition of outstanding scholarly contributions over the past three years, which he was awarded and received posthumously. Rathore made key contributions to the areas of organic supramolecular and materials chemistry. His interests focused in rational design and synthesis of novel electro-active molecules with applications in molecular recognition, photovoltaics, molecular electronics, and drug discovery. In particular, Rathore was well known for his contributions to studies of the Scholl reaction mechanism, syntheses of cofacially arrayed polyfluorenes, and applications of nitric oxide complexes with aromatic donors. His recent work was focused on elucidating the application of frontier molecular orbitals (FMOs) in the rational design of novel charge-transfer materials.

Synthesis of pillarene 
In 1995 Rathore and Kochi reported a synthetic procedure to produce various diarylmethanes from their corresponding benzyl methyl ethers. They showed that transformation of bis(methoxymethyl)-p-hydroquinone ether yields corresponding diarylmethane and a polymeric-like material. A reanalysis of this polymeric material showed that it consisted mainly from pillararene. A full characterization of pillararene was first reported in 2008 by Tomoki Ogoshi et al.

Personal life 
Rajendra Rathore was born in Kannauj, India in 1961. In college in Kanpur, India, he met his wife, Rajni. They had two girls.

In October 2018, Marquette University held the Rajendra Rathore Memorial Symposium, where friends and colleagues of Rathore spoke about their research and Rathore's influence on their science and lives.

References 

1961 births
2018 deaths
20th-century Indian chemists
Indian expatriate academics
Indian expatriates in the United States
Marquette University faculty
IIT Kanpur alumni
University of Western Ontario alumni
21st-century Indian chemists
Deaths from sarcoidosis